Ulitea was a schooner that John Hunter built in late 1829 or early 1830 in the Society Islands (Tahiti). She primarily traded between Sydney and Tahiti, but also sailed to Valparaiso and New Zealand. She was wrecked in New Zealand in February 1840.

Career
The first mention of Ulitea in the Sydney newspapers occurred in December 1832.

On 19 December 1832, the schooner Ulitea, Hunter, master, arrived at Sydney from Tahiti. She had left on 6 November and was carrying 18 casks of "cocoa-nut oil".  Her passengers included Mrs. Hunter and seven children, Captain Buckle, late master of the ship Matthews, which had wrecked at Tahiti, Mr. Robson late owner of Schnapper, which the natives had taken near Tahiti, and some others. Ulitea also brought the information that the whaler  had touched at  Eoora, Tonga.

On 18 January 1839 Ulitea, Captain Waddy, sailed for the Society Islands, with sundries. Her only passenger was Captain Hunter, her owner.

Fate
Ulitea was wrecked on the night of 29 February 1840 east of Sulphur Point in Tauranga Harbour. The captain cut away the masts during the night and hoisted a shirt to the bowsprit as a distress signal. A Mr Wilson, together with Maori from the Mission Station, took a boat out and brought all aboard on ashore. Newspaper reports in Australia, and then England and India, incorrectly reported that she had been lost with all  aboard.

Notes, citations, and references
Notes

Citations

References
 

1829 ships
Maritime incidents in February 1840